Radu Gabriel Lefter (born 17 February 1970) is a Romanian former professional footballer who played as a goalkeeper. Lefter played all his career for Ceahlăul Piatra Neamț, becoming a legendary player of this club.

References

External links
 

1970 births
Living people
Sportspeople from Bacău
Romanian footballers
Association football goalkeepers
Liga I players
CSM Ceahlăul Piatra Neamț players
Romanian expatriate sportspeople in Saudi Arabia